SATA (Serial AT Attachment), a computer bus primarily used for connecting storage disks.

SATA or Sata may also refer to:

Airlines
 SATA Air Açores, a Portuguese airline based in the Azores
 SATA International, the former name of the Portuguese airline Azores Airlines
 SA de Transport Aérien, a Swiss airline based in Geneva

People
 Genichiro Sata (born 1952), Japanese politician
 Ineko Sata (1904–1998), Japanese communist and feminist author of proletarian literature
 Michael Sata (1937–2014), politician and President of the Republic of Zambia

Places
 Sata, Kagoshima, a Japanese town now merged into Minamiōsumi
 Cape Sata, Japan
 Såta Nunatak, Antarctica
 Sáta, a village in Hungary
 Såta, the highest point on the island of Stolmen, Norway

Others
 SATA S.p.A. (acronym for "Società Automobilistica Tecnologie Avanzate"), an assembly car plants based in Melfi, Italy.
 Sata (food), a traditional dish from the Malaysian state of Terengganu
 Japanese oiler Sata, a Notoro-class oiler of the Imperial Japanese Navy